Drexciya may refer to:

 Drexciya, an American electronic music duo
 Drexciya (2010 film), a 2010 Ghanaian short film
 Drexciya (2012 film), a 2012 German-Burkinabe short film